Giant Steps is the third studio album by the Boo Radleys, released in 1993. The title is inspired by John Coltrane's album of the same name, and the record features an assortment of influences — their previous shoegazing sound backed by pop, reggae, noise pop and orchestral sounds.

Background
Guitarist Martin Carr had wanted to make an album that was more musically ambitious than the shoegaze sound they were known for. He said the rest of the band felt that no other act on the Creation Records roster were as competent as them. Journalist David Cavanagh said the band used the studio as an instrument, "push[ing] back the boundaries" of music as Screamadelica (1991) by Primal Scream had previously done, "crashing from genre to genre" as if the Boo Radleys were making their own iteration of the White album (1968) by the Beatles.

Release
Assistant press officer Andy Saunders was enamoured with the album; him and label co-founder Dick Green told marketing consultant Tim Abbot to "chuck everything at it", in terms of promotional efforts. While label co-founder Alan McGee liked "Lazarus", he thought the rest of it was too avant-garde for his music tastes. Carr was not worried by this response as McGee had taken some time to change his similar opinion on Everything's Alright Forever. "Lazarus" was released was the album's lead single in November 1992. McGee understood the change in the band's sound, but informed them that the label would be focussing their efforts on Mezcal Head (1993) by labelmates Swervedriver, who had the chance of becoming bigger in the US. To help aid the album's promotion, Saunders wanted Carr to be perceived by the press as a musical genius akin to Brian Wilson of the Beach Boys or Kevin Shields from former Creation group My Bloody Valentine. Alongside this, the band performed at Sound City festival in Glasgow.

Reception

Giant Steps received favourable reviews upon its release. It had sold 60,000 copies in 1993, becoming Creation Records' best selling release of the year. It reached the UK Top 20; "Lazarus" reached number 76 in the UK.

NME and Select named it as album of the year, and it was ranked as #1 in Fanning's Fab Fifty for that year.  Reviewing the album's rerelease in 2008, Sic Magazine wrote, "For 64 minutes they were the greatest band on the planet."

The album was also included in the book 1001 Albums You Must Hear Before You Die.

In 2016, Pitchfork ranked the album at number 25 in its list of "The 50 Best Shoegaze Albums of All Time", with critic Stephen Thomas Erlewine writing:

The following year, Pitchfork also ranked it at number 40 on its list of "The 50 Best Britpop Albums".

Track listing
All songs and lyrics written by Martin Carr.

Original release

2010 expanded edition
CD1 – Giant Steps

CD2 – Bonus disc 1
 "Lazy Day"
 "Vegas"
 "Feels Like Tomorrow"
 "Whiplashed"
 "Does This Hurt? - Edit"
 "Boo! Forever"
 "Buffalo Bill"
 "Sunfly II (Walking With The Kings)"
 "Rodney King (St Etienne Remix)"
 "As Bound As Tomorrow"
 "I Will Always Ask You Where You've Been Even Though I Know The Answer"
 "Peachy Keen"
 "Further"
 "Crow Eye"

1 – 4 taken from the Adrenalin EP.
5 – 8 taken from the Boo! Forever EP.
9 – 11 taken from the "I Hang Suspended" single.
12 – 14 taken from the "Wish I Was Skinny" single.

CD3 – Bonus disc 2
 "Tortoiseshell"
 "Zoom"
 "Cracked Lips, Homesick"
 "At The Sound Of Speed"
 "Let Me Be Your Faith"
 "Petroleum"
 "Lazarus (7" Version)"
 "Lazarus (Acoustic)"
 "(I Wanna Be) Touchdown Jesus"
 "Lazarus (St Etienne Remix)"
 "Lazarus (Secret Knowledge Remix)"
 "Lazarus (Ultramarine Remix)"
 "Lazarus (Augustus Pablo Remix)"
 "Lazarus (12" Version)"

1 – 3 taken from the "Barney (…and Me)" single.
5 – 8 taken from the "Lazarus" single.
9 – 14 taken from the "Lazarus (Remixes)" single.

Personnel

Sice – vocals
Rob Cieka – drums, percussion
Tim Brown – bass guitar, keyboards
Martin Carr – guitar, keyboards, vocals
Steve Kitchen – trumpet, flugel horn
Lindsay Johnston – cello
Jackie Toy – clarinet, bass clarinet
Meriel Barham – vocals on "Rodney King" and "One Is For"
Chris Moore – trumpet on "Lazarus"
Margaret Fiedler – cello on "Lazarus"
Keith Cameron – vocals on "The White Noise Revisitied"
Yvette Lacey – vocals on "The White Noise Revisitied"
Moose – handclaps on "Wish I Was Skinny", vocals on "The White Noise Revisitied"
Kle – vocals on "The White Noise Revisitied"
Laurence – vocals on "The White Noise Revisitied"
Nick Addison – vocals on "The White Noise Revisitied"
Guy Fixsen – vocals on "The White Noise Revisitied"
Russell – handclaps on "Wish I Was Skinny"
 BOO! Productions (Martin Carr, Tim Brown & Andy Wilkinson) – production, remixing on "Lazarus"
 Kevin & Barry – mastering (at Townhouse Studios)
 Andy Wilkinson – engineering
 Giles Hall – assistant engineering
 Anjali Dutt – mixing (at Battery Studios, London)
 Sarah Bedingham – assistance
 Alan Moulder – remixing on "Lazarus"
 Stephen A. Wood – sleeve art
 Designland Limited – layout

References
Citations

Sources

External links

Giant Steps at YouTube (streamed copy where licensed)

1993 albums
The Boo Radleys albums
Creation Records albums